Anthony James Balmforth (3 September 1926 – 20 February 2009) was Archdeacon of Bristol from 1979 until 1990.

Balmforth educated at Sebright School and Brasenose College, Oxford. He was ordained Deacon in  1952 and Priest in 1953. After a curacy in Mansfield he held incumbencies in Skegby, Kidderminster and Kings Norton until his Archdeacon’s appointment.

References

1926 births
2009 deaths
Alumni of Brasenose College, Oxford
Archdeacons of Bristol